Fánshān (矾山镇) may refer to the following locations in China:

 Fanshan, Lujiang County, town in Lujiang County, Anhui
 Fanshan, Zhuolu County, town in northwestern Hebei
 Fanshan, Cangnan County, town in Cangnan County, Zhejiang